Percy Addinall (1888 – 1932) was a footballer who played in the Football League as a left half for Lincoln City.

References

1888 births
1932 deaths
Footballers from Kingston upon Hull
Association football wing halves
English footballers
Lincoln City F.C. players
Grantham Town F.C. players
English Football League players